Archinemapogon schromicus is a moth of the family Tineidae. It found in Georgia (the Caucasus).

The wingspan is about 18 mm. The forewings are silvery white with a black pattern.

References

Moths described in 1964
Nemapogoninae
Taxa named by Aleksei Konstantinovich Zagulyaev